Saint Joseph is an unincorporated community in New Albany Township, Floyd County, Indiana.

History
Saint Joseph was founded in the 1840s by a colony of German Catholics.

Geography

References

Unincorporated communities in Floyd County, Indiana
Unincorporated communities in Indiana
Louisville metropolitan area
Populated places established in the 1840s
1840s establishments in Indiana